Lock, Stock and Two Smoking Barrels is a 1998 black comedy crime film written and directed by Guy Ritchie, produced by Matthew Vaughn and starring an ensemble cast featuring Jason Flemyng, Dexter Fletcher, Nick Moran, Steven Mackintosh, Sting with Vinnie Jones and Jason Statham in their feature film debuts.

The story is a heist involving a self-confident young card sharp who loses £500,000 to a powerful crime lord in a rigged game of three-card brag. To pay off his debts, he and his friends decide to rob a small-time gang who happen to be operating out of the flat next door.

The film brought Ritchie international acclaim and introduced actors Jones, a former Wales international footballer, and Statham, a former diver, to worldwide audiences. Based on a $1.35 million budget, the film had a box office gross of over $28 million, making it a commercial success.

A British television series, Lock, Stock..., followed in 2000, running for seven episodes including the pilot.

Plot 
In London, long-time friends and small-time criminals Eddie, Tom, Soap, and Bacon put together £100,000 so that Eddie, a genius card sharp, can buy into one of "Hatchet" Harry Lonsdale's high-stakes three-card brag games. The game is rigged and the friends end up owing Harry £500,000. Harry then sends his debt collector Big Chris to ensure that the quartet pay the debt within a week.

Also interested in a pair of expensive antique Holland & Holland shotguns up for auction, Harry gets his enforcer Barry "the Baptist" to hire two thieves, Gary and Dean, to steal them from a bankrupt lord. The two turn out to be highly incompetent and unwittingly sell the shotguns to Nick "the Greek", a local fence. Barry threatens the two into getting the guns back. Eddie returns home one day and overhears his neighbours—a gang of robbers led by a brutal man called "Dog"—planning a heist on some cannabis growers loaded with cash and drugs. Eddie relays this information to the group, intending for them to rob the neighbours as they return from their heist. Preparing for the robbery, Tom visits Nick the Greek to buy weapons and ends up buying the two antique shotguns.

The neighbours' heist gets underway and despite a gang member being killed by his own Bren gun and an incriminating encounter with a traffic warden, they succeed, returning home with a duffel bag full of money and a van loaded with bags of cannabis. Eddie and his friends ambush them as planned and drive away in the neighbours' van containing the cannabis and the traffic warden. They transfer the loot to their own van and return home, knocking out the traffic warden and dumping him by the road, then have Nick fence the drugs to violent gangster Rory Breaker. Rory agrees to buy the cannabis at half price but two of Rory's men visit the house of the cannabis-growers, discover they've been robbed and the cannabis he just bought had been stolen from his own growers. Rory threatens Nick into giving him Eddie's address and tasks one of the growers, Winston, to identify the robbers.

Eddie and his friends celebrate at his father JD's bar. Dog's crew accidentally learns that their neighbours robbed them and set up an ambush in Eddie's flat. Rory and his gang arrive instead and in an ensuing shoot-out, all except Dog and Winston are killed. Winston leaves with the drugs, while Dog leaves with the two shotguns and the money but Big Chris incapacitates him and takes everything. Gary and Dean, having learned who bought the shotguns, follow Chris to Harry's place, unaware of the latter pair's relationship.

Chris delivers the money and guns to Harry but upon returning to his car he finds Dog holding his son Little Chris at knifepoint, demanding the money be returned to him. Chris complies and starts the car. Gary and Dean burst into Harry's office, and the ensuing confrontation results in their deaths along with Harry's and Barry's. Returning to see the carnage at their flat and their loot missing, Eddie and his friends head to Harry's but upon discovering Harry's corpse, they decide to take the money for themselves. Before they are able to leave, Chris crashes into their car to disable Dog and then bludgeons him to death with his car door. He then takes the debt money back from the unconscious friends but allows Tom to leave with the antique shotguns after a brief stand-off in Harry's office.

The friends are arrested but soon acquitted after the traffic warden identifies Dog and his crew as the culprits. Back at the bar, they dispatch Tom to dispose of the antique shotguns—the only remaining evidence linking them to the case. Chris then arrives to give back the duffel bag, from which he has taken all the money for himself and his son and which now contains  a catalogue of antique weapons. Leafing through the catalogue, the friends learn that the shotguns are actually quite valuable (worth £250,000 to £300,000) and quickly call Tom to stop him from disposing of the guns. The film ends with Tom leaning over a bridge, with his mobile phone in his mouth and ringing, as he prepares to drop the shotguns into the River Thames.

Cast

 Nick Moran as Eddie
 Jason Flemyng as Tom
 Dexter Fletcher as Soap
 Jason Statham as Bacon
 Steven Mackintosh as Winston
 Vinnie Jones as Big Chris
 Nicholas Rowe as J
 Lenny McLean as Barry "the Baptist"
 P. H. Moriarty as "Hatchet" Harry Lonsdale 
 Frank Harper as Dog
 Sting as JD
 Huggy Leaver as Paul
 Stephen Marcus as Nick "the Greek" 
 Vas Blackwood as Rory Breaker
 Vera Day as Tanya
 Alan Ford as Alan
 Danny John-Jules as Barfly Jack
 Victor McGuire as Gary
 Rob Brydon as the traffic warden
 Steve Collins as boxing gym bouncer

Soundtrack

The soundtrack to the film was released in 1998 in the United Kingdom by Island Records. Madonna's Maverick Records label released the soundtrack in the United States in 1999 but omitted nine tracks from the UK release.
 "When I Fall Asleep" by Amir Fox
 "It's a Deal, It's a Steal" by Tom, Nick & Ed*
 "The Boss" by James Brown
 "Truly, Madly, Deeply" by Skanga*
 "Hortifuckinculturist" – Winston
 "Police and Thieves" by Junior Murvin
 "18 With a Bullet" by Lewis Taylor & Carleen Anderson*
 "Spooky" by Dusty Springfield
 "The Game" by John Murphy & David A. Hughes*
 "Muppets" by Harry, Barry & Gary
 "Man Machine" by Robbie Williams*
 "Walk This Land" by E-Z Rollers
 "Blaspheming Barry" by Barry
 "I Wanna Be Your Dog" by The Stooges
 "It's Kosher" by Tom & Nick
 "Liar, Liar" by The Castaways*
 "I've Been Shot" by Plank & Dog
 "Why Did You Do It" by Stretch
 "Guns 4 show, knives for a pro" by Ed & Soap
 "Oh Girl" by Evil Superstars
 "If the Milk Turns Sour" by John Murphy & David A. Hughes (with Rory)*
 "Zorba the Greek" by John Murphy & David A. Hughes
 "I'll Kill Ya" by John Murphy & David A. Hughes (with Rory)*
 "The Payback" by James Brown
 "Fool's Gold" by The Stone Roses*
 "It's Been Emotional" by Big Chris
 "18 With a Bullet" by Pete Wingfield

* Track omitted from 1999 US release.

Release history

Production

The production of the film followed Guy Ritchie's single short film which preceded Lock, Stock. As stated in filmscouts.com:Although it was Ritchie's first feature, his previous short film The Hard Case was sufficiently impressive to secure interest not only from financial backers but also persuaded Sting to take the role of JD. "I'd seen Guy's short film and was excited by the pace and energy in it. The way in which he handles violence and action appealed to me. I don't like gratuitous violence. I think it's much more chilling when it's suggested rather than graphic." For Ritchie, getting exactly the right actor for each role was essential. "The casting took forever and we auditioned hundreds of people, but I was determined to hold out until we got the real McCoy." This led to employing several genuine ex-cons, who certainly invest the film with its menacing undertones. Ritchie also looked to the celebrity arena to secure the right cast such as Vinnie Jones. "I didn't hesitate in casting Vinnie as I have the most incredible respect for his acting capabilities."

A one-hour documentary of the production of the film was released featuring much of the cast along with Ritchie.

Locations include Shoreditch for the gang hideout and Clerkenwell for JD's bar.

Marketing material

The film poster depicting the lead characters as very graphic black and white portraits against a stark white background was created by the advertising photographer John Mac, who is known for his advertising campaigns for luxury brands. He would use a similar technique some years later in 2019 when creating the front cover for the psychological thriller The Chair Man by Alex Pearl, which features a man in a wheelchair as a black silhouette against a stark white background.

Reception

Box office
The film was released on 28 August 1998 in the United Kingdom and was the second-highest grossing local production for the year behind Sliding Doors with a gross of $18.9 million.

Critical reception
On Rotten Tomatoes, the film has an approval rating of 75% based on 67 reviews, with an average rating of 6.70/10. The site's critical consensus reads "Lock, Stock, and Two Smoking Barrels is a grimy, twisted, and funny twist on the Tarantino hip gangster formula". On Metacritic, the film has a weighted average score of 66 out of 100 based on 30 reviews, indicating "generally favorable reviews".

John Ferguson, writing for the Radio Times, called the film "the best British crime movie since The Long Good Friday". Roger Ebert, in his review for Chicago Sun-Times, wrote: "Lock, Stock, etc.'' seems more like an exercise in style than anything else. And so it is. We don't care much about the characters (I felt more actual affection for the phlegmatic bouncer, Barry the Baptist, than for any of the heroes). We realize that the film's style stands outside the material and is lathered on top (there are freeze frames, jokey subtitles, speed-up and slo-mo). And that the characters are controlled by the demands of the clockwork plot. But "Lock, Stock'' is fun, in a slapdash way; it has an exuberance, and in a time when movies follow formulas like zombies, it's alive".

Accolades
The film was nominated for a British Academy Film Award in 1998 for the outstanding British Film of the Year. In 2000, Ritchie won an Edgar Award from the Mystery Writers of America for Best Motion Picture Screenplay. In 2004, Total Film named it the 38th greatest British film of all time. In 2016, Empire magazine ranked Lock, Stock 75th on their list of the 100 best British films, with their entry stating, “to call the plot "complex" is to do it a disservice – it's all so slickly done, delivered with such balls-out confidence and written with such an amazing turn of phrase that somehow the convoluted to-ing-and-froing works like clockwork. So well, in fact, that over 18 years later, it remains Ritchie's finest film, a fantastic achievement from a first-time director who took a group of meticulously-cast but relatively unknown actors and spun them into solid fackin' gold.”

Director's cut
Focus Features released the Locked n' Loaded Director's Cut in 2006. This version of the film contains more of each of the characters' backstories, and runs at a total time of 120 minutes.

See also
 Hyperlink cinema – the film style of using multiple interconnected story lines
 Heist film
 Phir Hera Pheri - An unofficial remake of the movie, with a similar plot but a slightly different storyline.

References

Further reading

External links

 
 
 
 

1998 films
1990s crime comedy films
1990s heist films
1998 independent films
1990s comedy thriller films
British crime comedy films
British gangster films
British heist films
British independent films
British comedy thriller films
British neo-noir films
Edgar Award-winning works
1990s English-language films
Films scored by John Murphy (composer)
British films about cannabis
Films about drugs
Films adapted into television shows
Films directed by Guy Ritchie
Films set in London
Hood films
Films about gambling
Gramercy Pictures films
HandMade Films films
PolyGram Filmed Entertainment films
Summit Entertainment films
Films produced by Matthew Vaughn
Films with screenplays by Guy Ritchie
Hyperlink films
1998 directorial debut films
1990s American films
1990s British films